Exometeorology is the study of atmospheric conditions of exoplanets and other celestial bodies outside the Solar System, such as brown dwarfs. The diversity of possible sizes, compositions, and temperatures for exoplanets (and brown dwarfs) leads to a similar diversity of theorized atmospheric conditions. For example, a gas giant's orbital period  can determine whether its wind patterns are primarily advective (heat and air flowing from the top of the star-heated atmosphere to the bottom) or convective (heat and air flowing from down near the gradually contracting planet's core up through the atmosphere).

In 2012, an international team of astronomers from the Institut d'Astrophysique de Paris and the Institut de Planétologie et d'Astrophysique de Grenoble detected meteorological variations in the atmosphere of the exoplanet HD 189733 b using the Hubble Space Telescope.  In 2017, astronomers using a telescope at the European Southern Observatory (ESO) in Chile found an atmosphere on earth-sized exoplanet Gliese 1132 b.

See Also

 Atmosphere and Extraterrestrial Atmosphere
 Atmospheric circulation of exoplanets; the mathematical models governing exoplanetary air circulation
 Atmospheric physics

References 

Branches of meteorology
Atmosphere
Gases
Planetary science
Exoplanetology
Exoplanets
Types of planet
Astronomy